Association football in New Zealand is one of the fastest growing and most popular sports amongst women. The National Women's League was created  in 2002 in order to help improve the New Zealand women's national football team. New Zealand Football is now focusing its efforts on youth development so the country can be internationally competitive.

History
The earliest development of women's football begun in 1973. The 2023 FIFA Women's World Cup will be hosted in New Zealand.

Governing Board
The Women's Soccer Association of New Zealand (WSANZ) used to have sole control of the women's game in New Zealand it  merged after becoming part of the national body, New Zealand Football.

WSANZ has disbanded its organisation and operates under New Zealand Football. New Zealand Football is the governs women's football in the country.

Domestic League

The National Women's League is the top tier professional Women's football league in New Zealand.

National team

The women's team's greatest international achievement was to win 1975 AFC Women's Championship. The national team has neither won or reached the second round of the World Cup. OFC Women's Nations Cup is used as a qualifier for the world  cup

See also
Association football in New Zealand
New Zealand women's national football team
National Women's League

References